Frederick Adolphus Philbrick, KC (13 June 1835 – 25 December 1910) was an English barrister and an early philatelist.

Life and career 
The eldest son of Frederick Blomfield Philbrick, Frederick Adolphus Philbrick was educated at the University of London (BA 1853). He entered the Middle Temple in 1858 and was called to the bar in 1860, joining the Home Circuit. He was appointed Recorder of Colchester in 1870, a Queen's Counsel in 1874, and was elected a bencher of the Middle Temple in 1876. He was appointed a County Court Judge in 1895.

Philately 
In 1866 he acquired the collection of Georges Herpin who coined the word "philatelie" in 1864.

He was one of the founders of the "Philatelic Society, London", which later became the Royal Philatelic Society London. He was its first Vice-President and was President of the Society between 1872 and 1892.

Philbrick was also an honorary member of the Fiscal Philatelic Society.

Two pseudonyms used by Philbrick in his philatelic writing were, An Amateur and Damus Petimusque Vicissim (the motto of British Guiana).

He was named as one of the "fathers of philately" on the Roll of Distinguished Philatelists.

References

Publications 
The Postage and Telegraph Stamps of Great Britain, 1881. (With W.A.S. Westoby)
"Notes on the Proofs and Essays of Great Britain" in Stamp Collectors Magazine, 1868.

External links 

Profile at Who Was Who in British Philately

British philatelists
Presidents of the Royal Philatelic Society London
1835 births
1910 deaths
20th-century English judges
People from Colchester
Fathers of philately
English King's Counsel
Members of the Middle Temple
19th-century English judges
Alumni of the University of London
County Court judges (England and Wales)